Brunswick Circuit Pro Bowling is a sports video game game released for Microsoft Windows and PlayStation in 1998 and the Nintendo 64 in 1999.

Gameplay 
These are the following game modes:
 Exhibition
 Skins
 Tournament
 Career
 Practice
 Cosmic

There are different lane conditions and different balls that react differently (the actual bowling balls, however, were all reactive, though several balls in the game are depicted as straight balls) as well as a physics engine that simulates real-life bowling physics.

There are also Brunswick Pro Staff members such as:
 Mike Aulby
 Chris Barnes
 Parker Bohn III
 Steve Jaros
 Johnny Petraglia
 Ricky Ward
 Walter Ray Williams Jr.
 Mark Roth
 Randy Pedersen
 Mike Miller

Development
The N64 version of the game was showcased at E3 1999.

Reception 

The PlayStation version received favorable reviews, while the PC version received average reviews, according to the review aggregation website GameRankings. Brunswick Circuit Pro Bowlings biggest supporters called the game addictive and the most accurate Bowling simulation ever. More lukewarm reviewers, written by critics uninterested in bowling, suggested only hardcore fans of the sport may enjoy the game. Jules Grant of The Electric Playground wrote in a three-month-early review of the PlayStation version that while there were different difficulty levels, there was no explanation of game rules and ball physics for those new to Bowling.

A common highlight was the game's realistic simulation of the sport, particularly with the physics. PC Gamer critic Joel Durham Jr. noted that the complexity of the pin movements led to varying, unexpected results: "Once in a while you’ll get lucky and a downed pin will roll into that last remaining pin for a strike; other times, you'll think you nailed the pocket but wind up with a split." Next Generation said that the PlayStation version's "only downfall is that it's kind of a slow-paced game with forgettable music and general-looking graphics. Still, it's good in all the right areas of gameplay, and it plays well."

Positive comments were made on the features, such as the high amount of them. Durham Jr. and AllGames Michael L. House claimed that the different oil patterns and gameplay modes, such as practice, incentivized players to improve their skills. Wrote Durham Jr., "you'll be yearning to raise your average just a little bit, or trying to nail those three strikes you need in the tenth to break 200". GameSpots Jeff Gerstmann praised the video clips about the bowlers, calling them "the most hilarious gaming moments in recent memory", and recommended even non-Bowling fans to buy the game just to see them. Game Informer enjoyed the replay option unusual in other games, and the Cosmic Bowling feature "because it's just too gaudy not to like". IGNs Tal Blevins also loved Cosmic Bowling, calling it one of the game's best modes.

Some reviewers generally found the presentation unspectacular. Reviews of the PC version from Jonah Falcon of Computer Games Strategy Plus and Scott A. May of Computer Gaming World found the graphics to take too little advantage of the 3D acceleration hardware. Blevins was repulsed by the still background crowd and little amount of sound effects, suggesting commentary audio should've been incorporated to spice up the experience. Game Informer also disliked the lack of commentary, was annoyed by the repetitive crowd sound effects, found the player character animations limited, and noted there is "little happening onscreen, yet somehow the graphics are still choppy". Grant and GamePros Air Hendrix, although just as lukewarm, opined that it looked and sounded the best a Bowling simulation could.

Falcon and Grant targeted the player characters. Grant disliked the limited options of bowler customization, particularly when it came to faces, clothing colors, and the absence of female characters. Falcon was outraged by the fact that there were no females, given that "bowling is one sport in which women are truly on par with the men, and have mixed pairs (like tennis and golf)". Additionally, he called out their "creepy" faces as well as the inability to vary body types, thus making the characters too similar to each other.

However, the visuals and sound were not without compliment, the player character animations a common highlight. Blevins applauded the soundtrack, particularly its variety of styles, which "ranges from funky fuzz guitar jams that remind me of Interstate '76 to AC/DC inspired heavy-metal licks". GameSpots Jeff Gerstmann praised the use of several camera angles and "surprisingly good" music.

Criticism was targeted toward the simple controls and setup. AllGame critic Anthony Baize argued the gameplay amounted to nothing more than pressing a single button frequently. Grant, May, Hendrix and Durham Jr. claimed that, despite the simple controls and setup, the experience was made complex and "smooth" by aspects such as realistic and unpredictable pin physics, differing levels of ball responses to the controls, and changing oil patterns between bowling alleys.

Brunswick Circuit Pro Bowling 2 
A sequel, Brunswick Circuit Pro Bowling 2, was only released for the PlayStation. It featured more characters (now including female characters), an easier throw system and many others.

See also 
 Brunswick Pro Bowling

Notes

References

External links 
 

1998 video games
Nintendo 64 games
PlayStation (console) games
Windows games
Bowling video games
THQ games
Multiplayer and single-player video games
Video games developed in the United States